Aldrei fór ég suður is an annual music festival held in Ísafjörður, Iceland, every Easter weekend since 2004. It is the brainchild of Mugison and his father, Guðmundur Kristjánsson, who came up with the idea after playing on a music festival in London in 2003, and is named after Bubbi Morthens song of the same name. Since its establishment, there has never been an entry fee to the festival and the bands do not get paid.

The festival is broadcast nationally live on Rás 2 and RÚV.

In 2020, the festival was only broadcast on TV and on the internet due to the coronavirus pandemic in Iceland.

Past artists
Bubbi Morthens
Emiliana Torrini
Gruff Rhys
Hatari
Laddi
Maus
Sigur Rós

References

2004 establishments in Iceland
Annual events in Iceland
Festivals established in 2004
Folk festivals in Iceland
Ísafjörður
Music festivals established in 2004
Music festivals in Iceland
Rock festivals in Iceland